Shayrat (also spelled Sha'irat) is a village in central Syria, administratively part of the Homs Governorate, located southeast of Homs on the western fringes of the Syrian Desert. Nearby localities include Dardaghan to the west, al-Manzul and al-Riqama to the northwest, Sadad to the south and al-Hamrat to the southwest. According to the Central Bureau of Statistics (CBS), Shayrat had a population of 1,443 in the 2004 census. Shayrat had been classified as an abandoned village or khirba by English scholar Eli Smith in 1838.

Shayrat is near Shayrat Air Base.

See also
 2017 Shayrat missile strike

References

Bibliography

Populated places in Homs District